Unabridged Bookstore is an independent bookstore started in 1980 by Edward Devereux. Unabridged Bookstore opened on November 1, 1980, with two business partners and $18,000. Unabridged Bookstore is known for its dedicated and knowledgeable staff. Hand-written, personal recommendations from employees line the shelves.

History

20th century 
Originally started as a one storefront on the 3200 block of North Broadway in the Lakeview neighborhood of Chicago. The store now occupies three storefronts and is one of the biggest independent bookstores. One of the oldest independent bookstores in Chicago and one of the only bookstores in the city focused on LGBTQ literature, "viewed as somewhat of a radical business plan" since its opening in the 1980s. Over the years the bookstore has become known for its chalkboard quotes and "its large selection of LGBTQ titles." Unabridged Bookstore has specialized in selling well-known and obscure gay and lesbian literature.

21st century 
Unabridged has an unparalleled sale book section, and an award-winning children's section, an extensive travel room, and offers a great selection of fiction and poetry. For more than 35 years, Unabridged Bookstore has also been Chicago's premier go-to-bookstore for LGBTQ literature and one of the coolest indie bookstores in the United States.

Voted "Best Bookstore in Chicago 2015" by Chicago Magazine, Unabridged remains an iconic institution in the Lakeview neighborhood.

References

External links 
 Unabridged Bookstore Website

Independent bookstores of the United States
Organizations based in Chicago